Bangladesh Islami Chattra Sena is a far-right student political party in Bangladesh, it is the student front of Bangladesh Islami Front. This organization follows the strongest belief of Ahle Sunnat Wal Jamaat i.e. the path of  Islamic Prophet Muhammad and his followers (Sahabi).They recognize the four Schools of Islamic jurisprudence as Hanafi, Maliki, Shafi'i and Hanbali and Sufi Tariqa i.e., Qaderi, Chistia, Nakshbandia, Shohrawardya and Muzaddedia. This organization is an anti group of world terrorism and so-called Islamic extremism. It is also supporter of Independence war of 1971 of Bangladesh.  
The present President of the party is Muhammad Maruf Reza and Secretary is Mohammad Nuruddin .

History
Bangladesh Islami Chattra Sena was founded on 21 January 1980. The founder student convener was M.A. Mannan, who later became the Chairman of its political party Bangladesh Islami Front established on 21 December 1990.

President
Muhammad Maruf Reza is the president of this party. He was selected for 2021-22 session by Bangladesh Islami Front's delicates.
General Secretary
Mohammad Nuruddin is the general secretary of 2021-22 session.

Flag

The Flag of this party mixed with three colors as black as symbol of Baitullah in Mecca, green as symbol of tomb of the prophet's grave in Madina and white as symbol of peace.

Logo

The logo was half moon with a star above and under the moon a verse of the Quran- Ja al Haqqu wajaahaqai Batilu (truth comes and false removes).

Protests
In August, 2014,Bangladesh Islami Chattra Sena chief Muhammad Nurul Haq Chisty made the announcement at a press meet that half-day strike across Bangladesh would be observed demanding arrest and trial of the killers of party leader Nurul Islam Farooqi.

Bangladesh Islami Chhatra Sena formed a human chain on the Dhaka-Sylhet Highway's Ashuganj Goalchattor area on Tuesday demanding exemplary punishment for the killers of Bangladesh Islami Front leader Nurul Islam Faruqui.

References

External links
 Chattrasena's Onugami App

Sunni organizations
Islam in Bangladesh
Islamic organizations established in 1980
1980 establishments in Bangladesh
Political parties in Bangladesh
Barelvi political parties
Student organizations established in 1980